Warren Hill may refer to:

People:
Warren Hill (musician), Canadian jazz and adult contemporary musician
Warren Hill (murderer), American murderer executed in 2015 by the state of Georgia

Places:
HM Prison Warren Hill, prison for male juveniles in Suffolk, England
Newmarket Warren Hill, railway station in Suffolk
Warren Hill, Bournemouth, important archaeological site and nature reserve on Hengistbury Head near Christchurch in Dorset, England with an elevation of 
Warren Hill, Hooke, Dorset, one of Dorset's highest hills, elevation 
Warren Hill, Nottinghamshire, suburban area of Arnold, Nottinghamshire, England
Warren Hill, Powys, hill in central Wales with an elevation of

See also
Warren Hills (disambiguation)